is a Japanese actress and J-Pop singer. Her nickname is Kanchan (菅ちゃん). She was born in Sakado, Saitama, Japan.

Career 
In 1992, Kanno made her debut as a member of a group called Sakurakko Club after passing the orientation for the TV variety show Sakurakko Kurabu. As a member of the Sakura Gumi, she started to participate actively for the group's second single DO-shite. Because the group was one that allowed its members to undertake their own individual endeavors, Kanno increased her level of work outside the variety show, while remaining as a regular in the show.

In 1993, she made her Japanese television drama debut in Twins Kyōshi (Twins Teacher), and has continued to appear in dramas ever since. In 1996, Kanno appeared in the drama Iguana no Musume (The Iguana's Daughter). Afterwards, she continued to take on lead roles in several TV and live stage dramas. Her role as a person trying to overcome hearing deficiencies while trying to build a family won the general public opinion vote, which later translated into several awards for her, such as the ATP Award and "Erando-ru New Talent" Award.

She made her solo debut on 24 March 1995 with "Koi o shiyō!" (Let's Love!), after Sakura Gumi disbanded. Her first album was released later that year. She also participated in photography modeling. On her 20th birthday, a book featuring nude photos taken by Miyzawa Masaaki titled Nudity went on sale and was one of 1997 top-ten bestselling books in Japan.

Besides starring in dramas, Kanno is also active in variety shows. In 2005, she featured in the Fuji TV show Burogu Taipu as a regular. While Kanno is mostly focused on acting, she still continues to sing.

Personal life
On 2 April 2013, Miho Kanno registered her marriage with fellow actor Masato Sakai in Tokyo.

She has two children with her husband, eldest being a boy born in 2015 and the younger being a girl born in 2018.

Filmography

Films

TV drama (serial) - As leading actress

TV drama (non-serial) - As leading actress

TV drama (serial) - As supporting actress

Video games 
 Keio Yuugekitai Katsugeki-hen (Victor Entertainment/1993-1998)

Discography

Albums

Singles 

As lead artist

Awards 
 Best Actress, 26th Japanese Drama Academy Awards, for her role as Tono Ririka/Hasui Shuka in Ai o kudasai (2000)
 Best Actress, 38th Japanese Drama Academy Awards, for her role as Tokuko in Ooku (2003)
 Best Supporting Actress, 27th Hochi Film Award, for her role as Sawako in Dolls (2002)
 Newcomer of the Year, 22nd Elan d'or Awards (1998)
 Best Picture (作品賞), 7th Hashida Awards (橋田賞), for the second TV drama Kimi no Te ga sasayaiteiru starring Kanno Miho as Nobe Mieko (1999)
 Grand Prix, ATP Awards, for the first TV drama Kimi no Te ga sasayaiteiru starring Kanno Miho as Takeda Mieko (later Nobe Mieko) (1998)

Notes

References

External links 
 
 JDorama profile
 Kanno Miho Official Site (in Japanese)
 JMDb profile (in Japanese)

1977 births
Living people
Actors from Saitama Prefecture
Japanese actresses
Japanese women pop singers
Japanese idols
Musicians from Saitama Prefecture
Ken-On artists
21st-century Japanese singers
21st-century Japanese women singers